In the United Kingdom, a Sloane Ranger, or simply a Sloane, is a stereotypical upper-middle or upper-class person, typically although not necessarily a young one, who embodies a very particular upbringing and outlook. The Sloane Ranger style is a uniform, effortless, and unambitious although sophisticated one. 

The television character Tim Nice-But-Dim, an Old Ardinian, is thought by some to be a good example of a Sloane Ranger. The term is a pun based on references to Sloane Square, a location in Chelsea, London, famed for the wealth of its residents and frequenters, and the television character The Lone Ranger.

Social stratum

The term dates from 1975 when aspiring writer Peter York had conversations with Ann Barr (then features editor of UK magazine Harpers & Queen) about what had become a recognisable tribe of young people living in Chelsea and parts of Kensington. This led to an article for the magazine, defining the characteristics of this slice of English society.

Female Sloanes, especially those involved in equestrian activities, were often seen in the 1970s around London wearing Hermès or Liberty silk headscarves distinctively tied between the tip of the chin and the bottom lip, masking the lower part of the face, which furthered the "Lone Ranger" jest.

Several years passed before York and Barr collaborated on the Official Sloane Ranger Handbook, which became a global best-seller in 1982.  The innovatory journalistic format and techniques from the 1975 article had by then become well established.  Ann Barr and her editorial team at Harpers & Queen spent much time working on the original draft of the 1975 article. The potential of the piece, to become a talking point and to define a new form of social comment, was seen from the start. Barr and the sub-editors at the magazine devised many of the 'attributes' of a Sloane, added as boxes to the main text, in what became a widely imitated format. These delineated the habits and customs of the social group in question, from clothes to shopping, to holiday venues, to choice of marital partner.

The Sloane Ranger proposal came from Martina (Tina) Margetts, a sub-editor on Harpers & Queen who worked (with fellow sub-editor Laura Pank) on the 1975 article. In her early twenties she had found herself amongst this social group while undertaking a course on fine art at the Victoria and Albert Museum.

Initially, the term "Sloane Ranger" was used mostly in reference to women, a particular archetype being Diana, Princess of Wales. However, the term now usually includes men. A male Sloane has also been referred to as a "Rah" and by the older term "Hooray Henry".
The term Sloane Ranger has equivalent terms in other countries: in France, they are called 'BCBG' (bon chic bon genre), while a near analogue in the United States is the preppy subculture.

The Official Sloane Ranger Handbook

Sloane Ranger, a commonplace term in 1980s London, was originally popularised by the British writers Peter York and Ann Barr in the book Style Wars (1980), followed by The Official Sloane Ranger Handbook (1982) and its companion The Official Sloane Ranger Diary. The books were published by the British society-watcher magazine Harpers & Queen, for whom Peter York was Style Editor and "was responsible for identifying the cult phenomena of "Sloane Rangers" and "Foodies".

The exemplar female Sloane Ranger was considered to be Lady Diana Spencer before marrying the Prince of Wales, when she was a member of the aristocratic Spencer family. However, most Sloanes were not aristocrats as Lady Diana was. Considered typical of SRs was patriotism and traditionalism, and a belief in the values of the upper-class and upper-middle-class culture, confidence in themselves and their given places in the world, a fondness for life in the countryside, country sports in particular, and in some cases philistinism. The title of the Sloane Ranger handbook lists the subheading "the problem of Hampstead", in reference to the stereotypical Sloane Ranger's supposed antipathy to the champagne socialist stereotype of the Hampstead liberal.

Sloane territory

Although Sloanes are nowadays supposedly more widely spread and amorphous than in the past, they are still perceived to socialise in the expensive areas of west London, most notably King's Road, Fulham Road, Kensington High Street, and other areas of Kensington, Chelsea and Fulham. The pubs and nightclubs in these areas are popular with Sloanes,  in particular the White Horse pub, known as the "Sloaney Pony" in Fulham, and Admiral Codrington, known as "The Cod", in Chelsea.

Sloanes are associated with being educated at top-tier elite schools, known as public schools in England. The most well-known schools for Sloane Ranger boys are Eton, Radley, Harrow, Westminster, St Paul's and  Sherborne. For girls, these are St George's School, Ascot, Wycombe Abbey, Downe House, St Mary's School, Calne, St Paul's Girls' School, Francis Holland School, and Benenden School. For co-educated boys and girls, these are Oundle School, Stowe School, Marlborough College, Wellington College, Pangbourne College, Fettes College, Glenalmond College and Ampleforth College. An expectation of a Sloane is that they also attended prep school. 

Sloane careers involve the country (farming/landowning, Chartered Surveyorship), the law, the City (finance/banking, consultancy) or the services (certain regiments of the British Army), the Foreign Office for men, and auctioning (art), property, business-owning or journalism/writing for women, although many for men and women are very much interchangeable.  

In 2015, Peter York argued that the Sloane population has been winnowed and that Sloanes were more likely to be leading the British trend to downward social mobility.

Sloanes
Diana, Princess of Wales was considered the archetypal Sloane Ranger of the 1980s ("the 1980s Super-Sloane") by The Official Sloane Ranger Handbook. 

The following people have been considered by some to be Sloanes:

 Jemima Goldsmith
 James Hewitt, Army officer and lover of Diana, Princess of Wales
 Tara Palmer-Tomkinson
 Trinny and Susannah
 Catherine, Princess of Wales
 Sarah, Duchess of York

See also

 Bon chic bon genre
 Bourgeois personality 
 British country clothing
 Class conflict
 International Debutante Ball
 Sloane Street
 Trixie (slang)
 Upper Class Twit of the Year (parody)
 Young fogey

References

External links

 "Return of the Sloanes" by Jeremy Langmead, The Guardian, 1 June 2007
 "Tory chic: the Return of Poshness" by Andy Beckett, The Guardian, 16 December 2009

British slang
English culture
Fashion aesthetics
History of subcultures
Slang terms for women
Social class in the United Kingdom
Social class subcultures
Stereotypes of upper class women
Subcultures
Upper class culture in Europe
Upper middle class
Youth culture in the United Kingdom